Marlborough Apartments is an apartment building in Montreal, Quebec, Canada. Its address is 570 Milton Street in the Milton Parc neighbourhood. It was designated a National Historic Site of Canada on November 16, 1990.

Built in 1900, it is four storeys tall and its facade is red brick. It was designed by architects Taylor and Gordon and is considered to be Queen Anne style architecture.

The building's front entrance and facade were used prominently in the 2004 Québécois film Love and Magnets (Les Aimants in French), directed by Yves Pelletier.

References

Apartment buildings in Quebec
Residential buildings in Montreal
Le Plateau-Mont-Royal
National Historic Sites in Quebec
Queen Anne architecture in Canada
Residential buildings completed in 1900